Art Washut is a Republican member of the Wyoming House of Representatives representing District 36 since January 8, 2019.

Elections

2018
Washut challenged incumbent Democratic Representative Debbie Bovee and ran unopposed in the Republican primary election. He defeated Bovee in the general election with 56% of the vote.

References

Living people
Republican Party members of the Wyoming House of Representatives
21st-century American politicians
Year of birth missing (living people)
Place of birth missing (living people)
Chadron State College alumni
University of Wyoming alumni